Frederick J. Segura Chirinos (born January 16, 1979) is a male professional track and road cyclist from Venezuela.

Career

2002
 1st in Stage 6 Vuelta a Venezuela, Valle de la Pascua criterium (VEN)
2006
 1st in Prologue Vuelta a la Independencia Nacional, Santo Domingo (DOM)
 1st in Stage 5 Vuelta al Oriente (VEN)
 1st in Stage 12 Vuelta a Venezuela, Cumaná (VEN)
2007
 1st in Stage 2 Vuelta al Estado Yaracuy, Nirgua (VEN)
 1st in Stage 8 Vuelta a Venezuela, Barinas circuito (VEN)
 1st in Stage 5 Vuelta al Estado Zulia, Maracaibo (VEN)
 3rd in General Classification Vuelta al Estado Zulia (VEN)
2008
 1st in Stage 6 Vuelta al Oriente, Puerto La Cruz (VEN)
 1st in Stage 2 Vuelta a Yacambu-Lara, Barquisimeto (VEN)
 1st in Stage 4 Vuelta a Yacambu-Lara, Quibor (VEN)
 1st in Stage 12 Vuelta a Venezuela, Barcelona (VEN)
2009
 1st in Clasico Ciudad de Valencia (VEN)
 2nd in Clasico Corre Por La Vida, Guanaré (VEN)
 1st in Stage 2 Vuelta al Estado Portugesa, Ospina circuito (VEN)
 1st in Stage 1 Vuelta Ciclista Aragua, Maracary (VEN)
 1st in Stage 5 Vuelta Ciclista Aragua (VEN)

References
 
Venezuelan cyclists

1979 births
Living people
Venezuelan male cyclists
Vuelta a Venezuela stage winners
Place of birth missing (living people)
Central American and Caribbean Games silver medalists for Venezuela
Competitors at the 2006 Central American and Caribbean Games
Central American and Caribbean Games medalists in cycling
20th-century Venezuelan people
21st-century Venezuelan people